Baghpat is a city in the Indian state of Uttar Pradesh. It is the administrative headquarters of Bagpat district, which was established in 1997. It is part of the National Capital Region, surrounding New Delhi.

Etymology
The original name of the city was Vyaghraprastha (Sanskrit: व्याघ्रप्रस्थ, meaning tiger city) because of the large number of tigers in that area. It is also mentioned as Vyaghraprastha in the Indian epic Mahabharata, one of the five villages that Krishna demanded from Hastinapur on behalf of the Pandavas, so as to avert the war.

During the Mughal Era, the city was named as Baghpat (Hindustani: बाग़पत)  by emperors in Delhi, in reference to the city's gardens.

History 
Baghpat is listed in the Ain-i-Akbari as a pargana under Delhi sarkar, producing a revenue of 3,532,368 dams for the imperial treasury and supplying a force of 200 infantry and 20 cavalry.

Geography 
Baghpat is located in western Uttar Pradesh, on the east bank of the sacred Yamuna river. Baghpat is the headquarters of Baghpat district, which is in the shape of a north–south rectangle. To the north of Baghpat district are Shamli and Muzaffarnagar district, to the east Meerut district, to the south Ghaziabad district, and to the west, across the Yamuna, Delhi, and Sonipat district in Haryana state.

Demographics
, Baghpat's 7880 households included a population of 50,310 of which 26,435 were males and 23,875 were females. 8,781 children ranged in age from 0 to 6. The literacy rate in Baghpat was 50.7%, with male literacy of 56.9% and female literacy of 43.8%. The effective literacy rate of the 7+ population of Baghpat was 61.43%, of which the male literacy rate was 68.9% and the female literacy rate was 53.1%. The Scheduled Caste population was 2,337. In 2011.

Administration
The chairman of Baghpat's Nagar Palika Parishad is Riazuddin (3rd term). The district magistrate is Raj Kamal Yadav.

Towns and villages
According to the 2011 census, 3 towns—a municipal council (Baghpat itself), and 2 notified area, or city, councils (Baraut, Khekhda and Baghpat)—within the tehsil, as well as 103 villages.

Education
 JagMohan Institute of Management and Technology

Notable people
Satya Pal Malik
Chandro Tomar
Prakashi Tomar
Satya Pal Singh

References

External links

 
Cities and towns in Bagpat district